Sidney Wewege (26 September 1907 – 16 May 1988) was a South African cricketer. He played in ten first-class matches from 1934/35 to 1937/38.

References

External links
 

1907 births
1988 deaths
South African cricketers
Border cricketers
Eastern Province cricketers
Sportspeople from Qonce